The Steam Engine Company No. 7 building is a historic firehouse located in Louisville, Kentucky, United States. The two-story, brick structure was built in 1871. It is an excellent example of the application of Victorian design principles to a utilitarian public building, and is stylistically related to contemporary buildings in the Limerick neighborhood.

The firehouse was placed on the National Register of Historic Places in 1980 in recognition of its architectural significance.

See also
Historic Firehouses of Louisville
Louisville Firehouse No. 2
National Register of Historic Places listings in Old Louisville, Kentucky

References

External links

, National Register of Historic Places cover documentation

Fire stations completed in 1871
1871 establishments in Kentucky
Victorian architecture in Kentucky
National Register of Historic Places in Louisville, Kentucky
Fire stations on the National Register of Historic Places in Kentucky
19th-century buildings and structures in Louisville, Kentucky
Government of Louisville, Kentucky